The National Film Award for Best Feature Film in Kannada is one of the National Film Awards presented annually by the Directorate of Film Festivals, the organization set up by Ministry of Information and Broadcasting, India. It is one of several awards presented for feature films and awarded with Rajat Kamal (Silver Lotus).

The National Film Awards, established in 1954, are the most prominent film awards in India that merit the best of the Indian cinema. The ceremony also presents awards for films in various regional languages.

Awards for films in seven regional language (Bengali, Hindi, Kannada, Malayalam, Marathi, Tamil and Telugu) started from 2nd National Film Awards which were presented on 21 December 1955. Three awards of "President's Silver Medal for Best Feature Film", "Certificate of Merit for the Second Best Feature Film" and "Certificate of Merit for the Third Best Feature Film" were instituted. The latter two certificate awards were discontinued from 15th National Film Awards (1967).

Directed by H. L. N. Simha, the 1954 film Bedara Kannappa, received the first Certificate of Merit. The film was based on the folktale of the hunter Kannappa who proves his extreme devotion to Lord Shiva by plucking out both of his eyes. However, the first "President's Silver Medal for Best Feature Film in Kannada" was only awarded at the 5th National Film Awards ceremony held on 16 April 1958 to the 1957 film Premada Puthri. The film was directed by R. Nagendra Rao and produced under his banner R. N. R. Pictures. Following is the list of Silver Lotus Award (Rajat Kamal) recipient films produced in Kannada language.

Winners 

Award includes 'Rajat Kamal' (Silver Lotus Award) and cash prize. Following are the award winners over the years:

References

External links 
 Official Page for Directorate of Film Festivals, India
 National Film Awards Archives

Kannada